International group may refer to:

 International intergovernmental organization
 :Category:United Nations coalitions and unofficial groups
 International Group, the name taken by two groups of British supporters of the communist Fourth International
 International Group (Riga), an anarchist organization active around the time of the Russian revolution of 1905